HP Hood LLC is an American dairy company based in Lynnfield, Massachusetts.  Hood was founded in 1846 in Charlestown, Massachusetts, by Harvey Perley Hood. Recent company acquisitions by HP Hood have expanded its reach from predominantly New England to the broader United States. Today, the company has an annual sales revenue of about $3.2 billion and more than 3,400 employees.

From 1980 to 1995, HP Hood was owned by Agway. That year, the company was acquired by the Kaneb Family. HP Hood is an independently owned, private company and is listed at #216 on the Forbes "America's Largest Private Companies 2018" list.

History 

In 1984, HP Hood was the first dairy to bring Lactaid-branded milk to the New England market; entrepreneur Alan Kligerman had introduced the Lactaid brand of lactase dietary supplements in 1977 and then started to license the brand to dairies in 1982.  In 1987, HP Hood, which had always been focused on New England, went nationwide for the first time with a low-fat ice milk product, Hood Light. 

In early 1991, Kligerman licensed the Lactaid brand to Johnson & Johnson subsidiary McNeil, which launched a massive advertising campaign that turned Lactaid into J&J's fastest-growing brand of the 1990s. That same year, under McNeil's supervision of the brand, HP Hood became the official supplier of Lactaid milk for the East Coast of the United States.  

In 2001, HP Hood renegotiated its contract with McNeil and became the official supplier of Lactaid milk for the entire United States market.  By 2004, Lactaid was the No. 1 national brand of milk in the United States.  

In 2004, the company acquired Crowley Foods, based in Binghamton, New York; and Kemps, based in St. Paul, Minnesota. In 2007, HP Hood acquired Crystal Cream and Butter Company, based in Sacramento, California, but then sold it that same year to Foster Farms Dairy. In 2008, they acquired the ice cream business of Brigham's Ice Cream, based in Arlington, Massachusetts. These acquisitions effectively expanded the company's reach from New England and New York to the broader United States.

In 2017, the company purchased a former Muller Quaker plant in Batavia, New York. In 2022, the company purchased land in Greenville, Texas, and has plans to expand capacity.

As of January 2023, the company's corporate officers were as follows:

 Gary R. Kaneb: Chief Executive Officer, President and Chief Financial Officer
 Paul C. Nightingale, Senior Vice President, General Counsel and Secretary
 Peter J. Spanedda, Senior Vice President, Sales
 Scott Blake, Senior Vice President, Operations
 Christopher S. Ross, Senior Vice President, Marketing & R&D
 Alice J. Kuhne, Group Vice President, Treasurer and Assistant Secretary
 James A. Marcinelli, Group Vice President, Controller
 Richard Kovarik, Group Vice President, Supply Chain
 Jonathan R. Fischer, Group Vice President, Food Safety & Quality
 Corey F. Jackson, Group Vice President, Human Resources
 Lynne M. Bohan, Group Vice President, Communications & Government Affairs
 Frank J. Wiggins, Group Vice President, Information Technology

Brands

Current brands
Hood
Crowley Foods
Heluva Good!
Axelrod Foods
M. Maggio Company
Penn Maid Foods
Booth Brothers Dairy
Green's Ice Cream
Brigham's Ice Cream
Hagan Ice Cream
Planet Oat
La Terra Fina
Lactaid (brand of McNeil Nutritionals, LLC produced by HP Hood since 1984)
Hershey's milk and milkshakes (brand of The Hershey Company produced by HP Hood since 2010)
Blue Diamond Almond Breeze (brand of Blue Diamond Growers produced by HP Hood since 2008) 
Southern Comfort Eggnog

Former brands
Kemps (sold to Dairy Farmers of America in 2011)
Goodrich Ice Cream
Rosenberger's Dairy (sold to Balford Farms in 2014)
Rosenberger's Dairy Wagon

Iconography 
HP Hood is a New England icon and their name and logo are well known. The smoke stack marked "Hoods Milk" at their former facility near Sullivan Square, Charlestown remains a landmark. The 20-acre facility is being redeveloped as a mixed residential-commercial campus called the "Hood Park".

The company ran a highway safety campaign called Hood Samaritan (see Good Samaritan) circa 1960, that was later taken over by the CVS Pharmacy chain.

At Boston Children's Museum, the outdoor ice cream stand takes the form of a large Hood Milk Bottle. The Hood blimp often appears at sport and cultural events (most often Red Sox home games above Boston, and the Eastern States Exposition in October). The Hood blimp made news on September 26, 2006 when it crashed in a wooded area near Manchester-by-the-Sea, Massachusetts.

The Hoodsie cup, a small cardboard cup of ice cream, is an iconic product; the term "Hoodsie" is occasionally cited as a shibboleth of the Boston-area dialect.

A United States Supreme Court case, H.P. Hood & Sons v. Du Mond, was decided in the Hood Company's favor, in which the State of New York was prevented from withholding a license to acquire milk produced in New York, and sold in Massachusetts, based on the dormant commerce clause limitations on state intervention in interstate commerce.

The company and their logo served as somewhat of an inspiration to the popular Phish tune "Harry Hood".

See also
John A. Kaneb

References

External links

Companies based in Lynnfield, Massachusetts
Dairy products companies of the United States
Companies formed by management buyout
Privately held companies based in Massachusetts
American companies established in 1846